Richard Edwards is a London-based classical and jazz trombone player as well as composer/arranger.

Discography

As sideman
With Jamiroquai
 Blow Your Mind (Sony Soho Square, 1993)
 Emergency on Planet Earth (Sony Soho Square,1993)
 Too Young to Die (Sony Soho Square, 1993)
 Half the Man (Sony Soho Square, 1994)
 The Return of the Space Cowboy (Sony Soho Square, 1994)

With Colin Towns
 Mask Orchestra (Jazz Label 1993)
 Nowhere & Heaven (Provocateur, 1996)
 Bolt from the Blue (Provocateur, 1997)
 Another Think Coming (Provocateur, 2001)

With Working Week
 I Thought I'd Never See You Again (Virgin, 1985)
 Companeros (Virgin, 1986)
 Fire in the Mountain (10 Records, 1989)
 May 1985 (Promising Music 2015)

With others
 Kim Appleby, Breakaway (Parlophone, 1993)
 Kim Appleby, Kim Appleby (Parlophone, 1990)
 Lorne Balfe, Penguins of Madagascar (Sony Classical, 2015)
 Gilbert Becaud, Ensemble (RCA, 1996)
 Belle and Sebastian, Dear Catastrophe (Rough Trade, 2003)
 Belle and Sebastian, I'm a Cuckoo (Rough Trade, 2004)
 Carla Bley, The Very Big Carla Bley Band (WATT/ECM, 1991)
 Carla Bley, Big Band Theory (WATT, 1993)
 Blur, Parklife (Food, 1994)
 Miguel Bosé, Por Vos Muero (WEA, 2004)
 Chris Botti, When I Fall in Love (Columbia, 2004)
 Paul Carrack, Soul Shadows (Carrack-UK 2016)
 Cocoon, Where the Oceans End (Barclay, 2010)
 The Cure, Wild Mood Swings (Fiction, 1996)
 Dominique Dalcan, Cannibale (Crammed Discs 1994)
 Aura Dione, Can't Steal the Music (Island, 2017)
 The Divine Comedy, Foreverland (Divine Comedy 2016)
 Sheena Easton, Fabulous (Universal, 2000)
 Caro Emerald, The Shocking Miss Emerald (Grandmono, 2013)
 Paloma Faith, The Architect (RCA Sony 2017)
 Florence and the Machine, How Big, How Blue, How Beautiful (Island, 2015)
 The Mike Flowers Pops, A Groovy Place (London, 1996)
 Peter Gabriel, Scratch My Back (Real World, 2010)
 Peter Gabriel, New Blood (Real World, 2011)
 Beth Gibbons & Rustin Man, Out of Season (Go! Beat, 2002)
 God Help the Girl, God Help the Girl (Matador, 2009)
 Hal, Hal (Rough Trade, 2004)
 Geri Halliwell, Schizophonic (EMI, 1999)
 Nick Heyward, From Monday to Sunday (Epic, 1993)
 Tuomas Holopainen, Music Inspired by the Life and Times of Scrooge (Nuclear Blast 2014)
 The Horrors, Skying (XL 2011)
 Hue & Cry, Showtime! (Permanent 1994)
 Hurts, Exile (Major Label 2013)
 Julio Iglesias, Noche De Cuatro Lunas (Columbia/Sony Discos 2000)
 Incognito, 100 Degrees and Rising (Talkin' Loud, 1995)
 Halo James, Witness (Epic, 1990)
 Katrina and the Waves, Waves (Capitol, 1986)
 Level 42, Forever Now (RCA/BMG 1994)
 Baaba Maal, Firin' in Fouta (Mango, 1994)
 Paul McCartney, Flaming Pie (Parlophone MPL 1997)
 Joni Mitchell, Both Sides Now (Reprise, 2000)
 Moondog, Moondog Big Band (Trimba Music 1995)
 Michael Nyman, Time Will Pronounce (Argo, 1993)
 Mark Owen, Green Man (RCA/BMG 1996)
 Renaud, Marchand De Cailloux (Virgin, 1991)
 Don Rendell, If I Should Lose You (Spotlite, 1992)
 Shorty Rogers, Bud Shank With Vic Lewis, Back Again (Choice, 1984)
 Rumer, Boys Don't Cry (Atlantic, 2012)
 John Surman, The Brass Project (ECM, 1993)
 John Surman, Free and Equal (ECM, 2003)
 Shriekback, Big Night Music (Island, 1986)
 Skank, Velocia (Sony 2014)
 Sting, Ten Summoner's Tales (A&M, 1993)
 Sting, The Last Ship (Cherrytree, 2013)
 Stonephace, Stonephace (Tru Thoughts 2009)
 Suede, Dog Man Star (Nude, 1994)
 Swing Out Sister, It's Better to Travel (Mercury, 1987)
 Swing Out Sister, The Living Return (Mercury, 1994)
 The Ten Tenors, Here's to the Heroes (Warner Bros., 2006)
 Tracey Ullman, You Caught Me Out (Stiff, 1984)
 John Warren, The Traveller's Tale (Fledg'ling, 2017)
 When in Rome, When in Rome (10 1988)
 Kenny Wheeler, A Long Time Ago (ECM, 1999)
 Tam White, Keep It Under Your Hat (Ronnie Scott's Jazz House 1991)
 Robbie Williams, Swing When You're Winning (Chrysalis, 2001)
 Amy Winehouse, Back to Black (Island/Universal 2006)
 Amy Winehouse, Love Is a Losing Game (Island/Universal 2007)

Soundtracks
 Marco Beltrami, World War Z (Warner Bros., 2013)
 Daft Punk, TRON: Legacy (Walt Disney, 2010)
 Anne Dudley, Gentlemen Don't Eat Poets (Pangaea, 1997)
 Michael Giacchino, Jurassic World: Fallen Kingdom (Back Lot Music 2018)
 Bernard Herrmann, The Day the Earth Stood Still (Varèse Sarabande, 2003)
 James Newton Howard, Fantastic Beasts and Where to Find Them (Music on Vinyl, 2016)
 James Newton Howard, Fantastic Beasts: the Crimes of Grindelwald (WaterTower Music 2018)
 James Newton Howard, Red Sparrow (Sony Classical, 2018)
 John Powell, Pan (Sony Classical, 2015)
 John Powell, The Bourne Ultimatum (Decca, 2007)
 Nick Urata, Paddington (Decca/Universal, 2014)
 Hans Zimmer, Inception (Reprise/WaterTower Music, 2010)
 Hans Zimmer, The Dark Knight Rises (WaterTower Music, 2012)
 Hans Zimmer, Kung Fu Panda 3 (Sony Classical, 2016)

References

British classical trombonists
Male trombonists
British jazz trombonists
Academics of the Royal College of Music
Year of birth missing (living people)
Living people
21st-century trombonists
21st-century British male musicians
British male jazz musicians